Derek Gee (born 3 August 1997 in Ottawa, Ontario) is a Canadian racing cyclist, who currently rides for UCI Continental team . He rode in the men's team pursuit event at the 2018 UCI Track Cycling World Championships. He qualified to represent Canada at the 2020 Summer Olympics.

Major results

Road

2015
 National Junior Road Championships
1st  Road race
1st  Time trial
 2nd Overall Ronde des Vallées
 7th Overall Tour de l'Abitibi
2017
 Challenge du Prince
5th Trophée Princier
7th Trophée de l'Anniversaire
2019
 4th Time trial, National Road Championships
2021
 National Road Championships
3rd Road race
3rd Time trial
2022
 1st  Time trial, National Road Championships
 8th Grand Prix de la Ville de Lillers

Track

2016
 2nd Omnium, National Championships
2017
 Pan American Championships
1st  Individual pursuit
1st  Team pursuit (with Aidan Caves, Jay Lamoureux & Bayley Simpson)
 National Championships
1st  Individual pursuit
1st  Team pursuit (with Bayley Simpson, Evan Burtnik & Adam Jamieson)
1st  Omnium
1st  Madison (with Evan Burtnik)
1st  Points race
2018
 National Championships
1st  Individual pursuit
1st  Team pursuit (with Michael Foley, Evan Burtnik & Adam Jamieson)
1st  Omnium
1st  Madison (with Michael Foley)
1st  Points race
2nd Team pursuit
 3rd  Team pursuit, Commonwealth Games
2019
 Pan American Championships
1st  Omnium
1st  Team pursuit (with Vincent De Haître, Jay Lamoureux & Michael Foley)
 National Championships
1st  Individual pursuit
1st  Omnium
1st  Madison (with Michael Foley)
2020
 National Championships
1st  Individual pursuit
1st  Omnium
3rd Team pursuit

References

External links

1997 births
Living people
Canadian male cyclists
Sportspeople from Ottawa
Cyclists at the 2018 Commonwealth Games
Commonwealth Games medallists in cycling
Commonwealth Games bronze medallists for Canada
Olympic cyclists of Canada
Cyclists at the 2020 Summer Olympics
Cyclists at the 2022 Commonwealth Games
Commonwealth Games competitors for Canada
Medallists at the 2018 Commonwealth Games